Below is a partial list of minor league baseball players in the Chicago White Sox organizations and rosters of their affiliates:

Players

Nick Avila

Nicholas Paul Avila (born July 25, 1997) is an American professional baseball pitcher for the Chicago White Sox of Major League Baseball (MLB).

Avila attended California State University, Long Beach. The San Francisco Giants selected Avila in the 26th round of the 2019 MLB draft. The White Sox selected Avila from the Giants in the 2022 Rule 5 draft.

Sean Burke

Sean Michael Burke (born December 18, 1999) is an American professional baseball pitcher in the Chicago White Sox organization.

Burke attended Saint John's High School in Shrewsbury, Massachusetts and played college baseball at the University of Maryland, College Park. He was drafted by the Chicago White Sox in the third round of the 2021 Major League Baseball Draft.

Burke spent his first professional season with the Arizona Complex League White Sox and Kannapolis Intimidators. He started 2022 with the Winston-Salem Dash before being promoted to the Birmingham Barons.

Andrew Dalquist

Andrew R. Dalquist (born November 13, 2000) is an American professional baseball pitcher in the Chicago White Sox organization.

Dalquist was born and grew up in Redondo Beach, California, and attended Redondo Union High School. As a senior, he went 9–0 with a 1.78 ERA and 103 strikeouts. Dalquist had committed to play college baseball at the University of Arizona prior to being drafted.

Dalquist was selected in the 3rd round of the 2019 MLB draft by the Chicago White Sox. After signing with the team, he was assigned to the Arizona League White Sox where he made three one-inning appearances, all of which were scoreless. After the 2020 minor league season was canceled due to COVID-19, Dalquist was added to the White Sox's alternate training site midway through the Major League season.

Dalquist was assigned to the Low-A Kannapolis Cannon Ballers for the 2021 season. Over 23 starts, he went 3–9 with a 4.99 ERA and 79 strikeouts over 83 innings.

Caleb Freeman

Caleb Aron Freeman (born February 23, 1998) is an American professional baseball pitcher in the Chicago White Sox organization.

Freeman attended Cooper High School in Abilene, Texas. He played college baseball for the Texas Tech Red Raiders, and in 2018 he played collegiate summer baseball for the Harwich Mariners of the Cape Cod Baseball League. A relief pitcher throughout his three seasons for the Red Raiders, he ended his junior year in 2019 2–0 with a 6.89 ERA over  innings. After the season, he was selected by the Chicago White Sox in the 15th round of the 2019 Major League Baseball draft. He signed for $25,000.

Freeman spent his professional season in 2019 with the Rookie-level Arizona League White Sox, the Great Falls Voyagers of the Rookie Advanced Pioneer League, and the Kannapolis Intimidators of the Class A South Atlantic League, going 4–2 with a 2.19 ERA and 38 strikeouts over  innings. He did not play a minor league game in 2020 due to the cancellation of the minor league season. For the 2021 season, he split the year between the Winston-Salem Dash of the High-A East and the Birmingham Barons of the Double-A South with whom he made 39 relief appearances and went 2–3 with a 3.27 ERA and 55 strikeouts over 44 innings. He was selected to play in the Arizona Fall League for the Glendale Desert Dogs where he was named to the Fall Stars game. He opened the 2022 season back with Birmingham, but missed nearly three months due to injury. Over  innings pitched with Birmingham, he posted an 8.79 ERA with 14 walks and 15 strikeouts.

Wes Kath

Weston Douglas Kath (born August 3, 2002) is an American professional baseball third baseman in the Chicago White Sox organization.

Kath attended Desert Mountain High School in Scottsdale, Arizona. He committed to play college baseball at Arizona State University. He played in both the Area Code Games and the World Wood Bat Association World Championship in 2020. In 2021, as a senior, he helped lead Desert Mountain to a 5A State Championship title. He was subsequently named the Arizona Gatorade High School Baseball Player of the Year after batting .486 with 11 home runs, 29 RBIs, and 34 runs scored.

Kath was selected by the Chicago White Sox in the second round with the 57th overall selection of the 2021 Major League Baseball draft. He signed for $1.8 million. He made his professional debut with the Rookie-level Arizona Complex League White Sox. Over 104 at-bats in 28 games, he slashed .212/.287/.337 with three home runs and 15 RBIs. He was assigned to the Kannapolis Cannon Ballers of the Single-A Carolina League to begin the 2022 season. In mid-August, he was promoted to the Birmingham Barons of the Double-A Southern League. Over 112 games between the two teams, Kath batted .230 with 13 home runs, 45 RBIs, and 21 doubles.

Will Kincanon

William Anthony Kincanon (born October 27, 1995) is an American professional baseball pitcher in the Chicago White Sox organization.

Kincanon attended Riverside Brookfield High School in Riverside, Illinois, where he played baseball and basketball. In 2014, his senior year, he went 9–3 with a 0.91 ERA alongside batting .486. After graduating from high school, he played two seasons of college baseball at Triton College in River Grove, Illinois. After his sophomore year in 2016, he was selected by the Los Angeles Dodgers in the 29th round of the 2016 Major League Baseball draft, but did not sign and instead transferred to Indiana State University. As a junior at Indiana State, he started 14 games in which he compiled a 5–5 record and a 5.24 ERA over 79 innings. After the season, he was selected by the Chicago White Sox in the 11th round of the 2017 Major League Baseball draft.

Kincanon signed with the White Sox and made his professional debut that year with the Great Falls Voyagers of the Rookie Advanced Pioneer League, going 2–1 with a 3.94 ERA over 21 relief appearances. He spent 2018 with the Kannapolis Intimidators of the Class A South Atlantic League where he went 3–1 with a 3.63 ERA over 26 games out of the bullpen, and 2019 with the Winston-Salem Dash of the Class A-Advanced Carolina League where he pitched to a 3–3 record and a 1.86 ERA over 58 relief innings, striking out 71, earning All-Star honors. He did not play a minor league game in 2020 due to the cancellation of the minor league season caused by the COVID-19 pandemic. To begin the 2021 season, he was assigned to the Birmingham Barons of the Double-A South. After pitching four innings, he was placed on the injured list, and missed the remainder of the year. Prior to the start of the 2022 season, he underwent Tommy John surgery.

Cristian Mena

Cristian José Mena (born December 21, 2002) is a Dominican professional baseball pitcher in the Chicago White Sox organization.

Mena signed with the Chicago White Sox as an international free agent in July 2019. He did not pitch for a team in 2020 due to the Minor League Baseball season being cancelled because of the Covid-19 pandemic. He made his professional debut in 2021 with the Arizona Complex League White Sox.

He started 2022 with the Kannapolis Intimidators before being promoted to the Winston-Salem Dash and Birmingham Barons.

Bryan Ramos

Bryan Ramos (born March 12, 2002) is a Cuban professional baseball third baseman for the Chicago White Sox of Major League Baseball (MLB).

Ramos signed with the Chicago White Sox as an international free agent in July 2018. He made his professional debut in 2019 with the Arizona League White Sox.

Ramos did not play in 2020, due to there being no Minor League Baseball season because of the Covid-19 pandemic. He returned in 2021 to play for the Kannapolis Cannon Ballers and played 2022 with the Winston-Salem Dash and Birmingham Barons.

Ramos was optioned to Double-A Birmingham to begin the 2023 season.

Zach Remillard

Zachary Michael Remillard (born February 21, 1994) is an American professional baseball third baseman in the Chicago White Sox organization.

Remillard grew up in Cohoes, New York, and attended the La Salle Institute in Troy, New York. As a senior, he batted .406 with 12 doubles, four home runs, 19 RBI and 21 stolen bases and was named the Albany Times Union Player of the Year. Remillard was selected in 38th round by the Houston Astros in 2012 Major League Baseball draft, but opted not to sign with the team.

Remillard played college baseball at Coastal Carolina Chanticleers and was a starter for four seasons. He tore his Ulnar collateral ligament in his throwing elbow as a sophomore, but opted to play the rest of the season and wait until the summer to undergo Tommy John surgery. Remillard returned as a junior and hit .272 with six home runs, 12 doubles and 42 RBIs. Remillard led the Chanticleers with 19 home runs while batting .341 with 72 RBIs on the 2016 National Championship team.

Remillard was selected in the 10th round of the 2016 Major League Baseball draft by the Chicago White Sox. After signing with the team, he was initially assigned to the Arizona League White Sox, where he batted .310 with two home runs and nine RBIs before being promoted to the Kannapolis Intimidators of the Class A South Atlantic League. Remillard also spent the 2017 season with Kannapolis, hitting .246 in 133 games with 27 doubles, two triples, seven home runs, and 50 RBIs. He was assigned to the High-A Winston-Salem Dash and hit for a .250 average with 16 doubles, three triples, 11 homers, 52 RBIs in 2018. He also started the following season with Winston-Salem before being promoted to the Birmingham Barons of the Double-A Southern League after hitting .289.

Coastal Carolina Chanticleers bio

José Rodríguez

José Augusto Rodríguez (born May 13, 2001) is a Dominican professional baseball infielder for the Chicago White Sox of Major League Baseball (MLB).

Rodríguez signed with the Chicago White Sox as an international free agent in February 2018. He made his professional debut that season with the Dominican Summer League White Sox and played 2019 with the Arizona League White Sox.

Rodríguez did not play in 2020, due to there being no Minor League Baseball season because of Covid-19. He returned in 2021 to play for the Kannapolis Cannon Ballers, Winston-Salem Dash and Birmingham Barons. After the season he played in the Arizona Fall League.

Rodríguez was optioned to Double-A Birmingham to begin the 2023 season.

Yolbert Sánchez

Yolbert Sánchez (born March 3, 1997) is a Cuban professional baseball infielder in the Chicago White Sox organization.

Sánchez played in the Cuban National Series from 2015 to 2018. In July 2019, he signed with the Chicago White Sox as an international free agent. He made his professional debut in 2019 with the Dominican Summer League White Sox.

After not playing in 2020, due to there being no Minor League Baseball season because of Covid-19, Sánchez played 2021 with the Winston-Salem Dash and Birmingham Barons. After the season, he played in the Arizona Fall League. He started 2022 with Birmingham before being promoted to the Charlotte Knights.

Jordan Sprinkle

Jordan Sprinkle (born March 6, 2001) is an American professional baseball shortstop in the Chicago White Sox organization.

Sprinkle grew up in Palm Springs, California and attended Palm Desert High School.

Sprinkle played college baseball for the UC Santa Barbara Gauchos for three seasons. He played in three games and went hitless in two at-bats during his true freshman season before it was cut short due to the coronavirus pandemic. Sprinkle was named the Big West Conference Co-Freshmen Field Player of the Year as a redshirt freshman after batting .353 with 18 doubles, seven home runs, and 32 RBIs and led the conference with 26 stolen bases. He was named second team All-Big West after hitting .285 with 32 RBIs, 44 runs scored, and 25 stolen bases. Following the end of the season he entered the NCAA transfer portal and committed to play at Arkansas.

Sprinkle was selected in the fourth round of the 2022 MLB draft by the Chicago White Sox. He signed with the team on July 27, 2022, and received a $452,900 signing bonus.

UC Santa Barbara Gauchos bio

Tristan Stivors

Tristan Lee Stivors (born September 22, 1998) is an American professional baseball pitcher for the Chicago White Sox organization.

Stivors graduated from Medina Valley High School in Castroville, Texas. He enrolled at New Mexico Junior College and in 2019, he transferred to Texas State University to play college baseball for the Texas State Bobcats. In 2022, Stivors led the NCAA in saves and was a consensus All-American selection. He also won the Stopper of the Year Award. The Chicago White Sox selected Stivors in the 16th round, with the 491th overall selection, of the 2022 MLB draft.

Matthew Thompson

Matthew Philip Thompson (born August 11, 2000) is an American professional baseball pitcher in the Chicago White Sox organization.

Thompson was born in Houston, Texas and grew up in Cypress, Texas, where attended Cypress Ranch High School. After his junior year, he played in the Perfect Game All-American Classic and the Under Armour All-America Game. Thompson finished his senior season with a 13–0 record and a 0.87 ERA with 124 strikeouts.

Thompson was selected in the second round of the 2019 MLB draft by the Chicago White Sox. After signing with the team, he was assigned to the Arizona League White Sox, where he made two one-inning appearances. After the 2020 minor league season was canceled due to COVID-19, Thompson was added to the White Sox's alternate training site.

Thompson was assigned to the Low-A Kannapolis Cannon Ballers for the 2021 season. Over 19 starts, he went 2–8 with a 5.90 ERA and 77 strikeouts over  innings.

Norge Vera

Norge Carlos Vera (born June 1, 2000) is a Cuban professional baseball pitcher in the Chicago White Sox organization.

Vera played in the Cuban National Series in 2018/2019. He signed with the Chicago White Sox as an international free agent in February 2021.

Vera made his professional debut that year with the Dominican Summer League White Sox. He started 2022 with the Kannapolis Cannon Ballers before being promoted to the Winston-Salem Dash.

His father, Norge Luis Vera, also played in the Cuban National Series and the Cuba national baseball team.

Austin Warner

Austin Scott Warner (born June 27, 1994) is an American professional baseball pitcher in the Chicago White Sox organization.

Warner was born and grew up in Louisville, Kentucky, where he attended Trinity High School. He played college baseball at NCAA Division II Bellarmine University. Over the course of his collegiate career, Warner went 15-12 with a 3.37 ERA and 211 strikeouts in  innings pitched.

Warner was undrafted in the 2016 Major League Baseball draft and signed with the River City Rascals of the independent Frontier League. He pitched for the Rascals into the 2017 season before his contract was purchased by the St. Louis Cardinals on June 15, 2017. Warner went 6-1 with a 4.01 ERA over 16 appearances, 12 of which were starts, during his time with River City.

After signing, Warner was assigned to the Gulf Coast League Cardinals and was briefly elevated to the Class A-Advanced Palm Beach Cardinals due to a shortage of relief pitchers, pitching three scoreless innings and earning a win in relief in his only appearance. He was later promoted to the Class A Peoria Chiefs of the Midwest League. Warner began the 2018 season in the Florida State League with Palm Beach before earning a promotion to the Double-A Springfield Cardinals after 12 starts with a 3-3 record and a 3.41 ERA. Warner was promoted a second time to the Memphis Redbirds of the Triple-A Pacific Coast League. He returned to Springfield in 2019 and was named a Texas League All-Star before being promoted to Memphis for the rest of the 2019 season. Warner did not play in 2020 due to the cancellation of the minor league season caused by the COVID-19 pandemic, but was later assigned to the Cardinals' Alternate Training Site. For the 2021 season, he returned to Memphis. Over 41 appearances for the season, he went 7-3 with a 3.34 ERA and 75 strikeouts over  innings. On March 31, 2022, Warner was released by the Cardinals organization.

On April 4, 2022, Warner signed a minor league contract with the Seattle Mariners organization. Warner made 33 appearances (12 starts) for the Triple-A Tacoma Rainiers, logging a 5-3 record and 5.21 ERA with 72 strikeouts in 86.1 innings pitched. He became a free agent following the season on November 10.

On February 28, 2023, Warner signed a minor league contract with the Chicago White Sox organization.

Bellarmine Knights bio

Full Triple-A to Rookie League rosters

Triple-A

Double-A

High-A

Single-A

Rookie

Foreign Rookie

References

Minor league players
Lists of minor league baseball players